Ségur is a commune in the Aveyron department in southern France. Its inhabitants are the Ségurois, Séguroises.

Geography 
Ségur is situated on the D29, the main road connecting the City of Rodez to Millau.

History
With its church perched on a hill and tightly packed houses, the village is well known to fishermen who enjoy Viaur and its banks. Segur is the starting point of a cultural tour with beautiful Romanesque churches and the Sanctuary of Bergounhoux, a place of pilgrimage.

Population

See also
Communes of the Aveyron department

References

Communes of Aveyron
Aveyron communes articles needing translation from French Wikipedia